Broomlee railway station served the village of West Linton, Peeblesshire, Scotland, from 1864 to 1933 on the Leadburn, Linton and Dolphinton Railway.

History 
The station opened as West Linton on 4 July 1864 by the Leadburn, Linton and Dolphinton Railway. It was also known as Broomlee cot West Linton in the NBR and LMS timetables. On the north side of the platform was the station building and the goods yard, which was on the opposite side of the level crossing, had sidings to the north and the south. The station's name was changed to Broomlee to avoid confusion with another station of the same name. The signal box, which was opened in 1895, was to the northeast of the station building. The station closed on 3 May 1933.

References 

Disused railway stations in the Scottish Borders
Railway stations in Great Britain opened in 1864
Railway stations in Great Britain closed in 1933
1864 establishments in Scotland
1933 disestablishments in Scotland
Beeching closures in Scotland